James Harlan York (born August 27, 1947, in Maywood, California) is a former professional baseball pitcher. In his six-year Major League Baseball career, he played for the Kansas City Royals, the Houston Astros, and the New York Yankees.

Amateur career 
York graduated from Norwalk High School (California) in 1965 and then attended college at UCLA and played in the 1969 College World Series for the Bruins with Chris Chambliss.

Professional career 
In six years and 174 games, York posted a lifetime record of 16–17, 194 strikeouts and an ERA of 3.79. His best season statistically came with Kansas City in 1971, when he had career bests with 103 strikeouts, a 2.89 ERA, and a 5–5 record, and earned $12,500. As a batter, he got three hits in 40 at bats in his career. He hit one home run, also in the 1971 season, against Cleveland Indians pitcher Alan Foster. He was traded with Lance Clemons from the Royals to the Houston Astros for John Mayberry and minor league infielder Dave Grangaard at the Winter Meetings on December 2, 1971.

After being released by the Yankees in August 1976, York had a minor league stint with the Iowa Oaks in the Chicago White Sox organization. After not playing professionally in 1977, he retired in 1978.

His uniform numbers include 40, 42, and 43.

References

External links

 Stats at Baseball Almanac

Baseball players from California
Major League Baseball pitchers
1947 births
Living people
Houston Astros players
Kansas City Royals players
New York Yankees players
People from Maywood, California
Sportspeople from Los Angeles County, California
Denver Bears players
Elmira Pioneers players
High Point-Thomasville Royals players
Iowa Oaks players
Omaha Royals players
Oklahoma City 89ers players
Syracuse Chiefs players
UCLA Bruins baseball players
Winnipeg Goldeyes players